C string may refer to:
 C-string (clothing), a specific type of thong, or a brand of women shorts
 C string handling
 C string, a programming data structure
 C string (music), one of the strings on various instruments, for example the lowest string on the viola and cello
 Null-terminated string